Tybamate (INN; Solacen, Tybatran, Effisax) is an anxiolytic of the carbamate family. It is a prodrug for meprobamate in the same way as the better known drug carisoprodol. It has liver enzyme inducing effects similar to those of phenobarbital but much weaker.

As the trade name Tybatran (Robins), it was formerly available in capsules of 125, 250, and 350 mg, taken 3 or 4 times a day for a total daily dosage of 750 mg to 2 g. The plasma half-life of the drug is three hours. At high doses in combination with phenothiazines, it could produce convulsions.

References

Anxiolytics
Carbamates
Prodrugs
GABAA receptor positive allosteric modulators